Anders Zachariassen (born 4 September 1991) is a Danish handball player for GOG and the Danish national team.

He has previously played in Denmark for SønderjyskE and in Germany for SG Flensburg-Handewitt.

He was named Player of the Season by fans in his first season with SG Flensburg-Handewitt.

References

External links

SG Flensburg-Handewitt profile

Danish male handball players
People from Sønderborg Municipality
Living people
1991 births
SønderjyskE Håndbold players
Expatriate handball players
Danish expatriate sportspeople in Germany
Handball-Bundesliga players
SG Flensburg-Handewitt players
Sportspeople from the Region of Southern Denmark